Oud- en Nieuw-Gastel was a municipality in the Dutch province of North Brabant. It covered the villages of Oud Gastel, located 7 km north of Roosendaal, and Stampersgat.

The municipality existed until 1997, when it became part of the new municipality of Halderberge.

References

Municipalities of the Netherlands disestablished in 1997
Former municipalities of North Brabant
Halderberge